Andrea D'Egidio (born 30 June 1996) is an Italian professional footballer who plays as a goalkeeper for Serie D club Pineto.

Career
He made his Serie C debut for Matera on 30 October 2016 in a game against Akragas.

On 5 December 2020 he joined Teramo.

After leaving Teramo in June 2021 and missing most of the 2021–22 season, on 24 March 2022 D'Egidio returned to Teramo until the end of the season.

References

External links
 
 

1996 births
Living people
Sportspeople from the Province of Teramo
Footballers from Abruzzo
Italian footballers
Association football goalkeepers
Serie C players
Ascoli Calcio 1898 F.C. players
Matera Calcio players
F.C. Südtirol players
Pisa S.C. players
S.S. Teramo Calcio players